James Frederick Campen (born June 11, 1964) is a former American football center and current offensive line coach for the Carolina Panthers of the National Football League (NFL). He played for the New Orleans Saints and Green Bay Packers.

He previously spent 11 seasons as the offensive line coach for the Packers who had seven Pro Bowl linemen during his tenure there. Campen left the Packers in 2019 to become associate head coach/offensive line coach with the Cleveland Browns, then coached offensive line for the Los Angeles Chargers in 2020. On March 10, 2021, Campen was hired as offensive line coach for the Houston Texans.

Personal life
Campen graduated in 1982 from Ponderosa High School in Shingle Springs, California. At Ponderosa he made all metro and all-league his junior and senior years of school.  He was also voted "all-decade" for the 1980's as an individual player. During a break from professional football Campen returned to Shingle Springs, California and coached for 10 years between 1994 and 2004 with five years as head coach. He also opened a hardware store in Shingle Springs, California. Now he lives with his family in Suamico, Wisconsin.

References

1964 births
Living people
American football centers
Green Bay Packers coaches
Green Bay Packers players
New Orleans Saints players
Players of American football from Sacramento, California
Tulane Green Wave football players
Sacramento City Panthers football players
People from Suamico, Wisconsin
National Football League replacement players
Cleveland Browns coaches
Los Angeles Chargers coaches
Houston Texans coaches
Carolina Panthers coaches